Charlottenburg Town Hall is an administrative building situated in the Charlottenburg locality of Berlin in Germany. It was built between 1899 and 1905 at the behest of the then independent city of Charlottenburg in the Prussian province of Brandenburg.

History
Upon the death of Queen consort Sophia Charlotte of Hanover, the former village of Lietzow was renamed Charlottenburg and received town privileges by order of King Frederick I of Prussia on 5 April 1705. A first town hall was established in a court building near Charlottenburg Palace. The town's population consisted mainly of royal officials and initially the king also assumed the office of the mayor. As from the mid 19th century the population grew rapidly, the building became too small to house the municipal offices and in 1860 a new town hall was inaugurated eastwards on the road to the Prussian capital Berlin, the present-day Otto-Suhr-Allee.

Inaugurated on the town's 200-years-jubilee in 1905, it soon had to be enlarged by an eastern annex built in 1910 according to plans designed by Heinrich Seeling.

Upon the city's incorporation according to the 1920 Greater Berlin Act, the building became the administrative seat of the Charlottenburg borough. Severely damaged during the bombing of Berlin in World War II by an RAF air raid in the night of 22 November 1943, it was gradually rebuilt by the West Berlin authorities until the 1960s. The town hall today houses several departments of the Charlottenburg-Wilmersdorf borough's administration and a community library.

See also
Rathaus Schöneberg
Rotes Rathaus

External links

Charlottenburg-Wilmersdorf at berlin.de
 Rathaus Charlottenburg

Buildings and structures in Charlottenburg-Wilmersdorf
City and town halls in Germany